Various tetradecadienyl acetate compounds serve as insect mating pheromones especially among the Pyralidae. These include:

   Prionoxystus robiniaea mating attractant
   Accosus centerensis mating attractant
   Borkhausenia schefferella mating attractant
   Conistra vaccinii mating attractant
  (abbr. Z9,E11-14:Ac)  Spodoptera littoralis and S. litura mating attractant and mating inhibitor. Female pheromone, lures males. Although they achieved good mating disruption this did not result in lower egg mass or population. The results of Campion et al., 1980 suggest that may be due to the need for other, minor female volatiles. Martinez et al., 1993 study control of its synthesis in S. littoralis by hormones, finding that the reduction step may be controlled by pheromone biosynthesis activating neuropeptide.
   Plodia interpunctella mating inhibitor
  (abbr. Z9,E12-14:Ac)  In 2006 the United States Environmental Protection Agency granted an exemption to permit use without regard to the residue on resulting food. This is thought to be the first registration for indoor use in the United States of any sex pheromone to disrupt mating. Produced by species:
 Adoxophyes fasciata synergistic attractant
 Anagasta kuehniella mating attractant produced by both male and female
 Cadra cautella female-produced mating attractant and mating inhibitor (found by Kuwahara et al., 1971)
 C. figulilella female-produced mating attractant
 Elasmopalpus lignosellus mating disruptor
 Ephestia elutella mating attractant
 Plodia interpunctella (also by Kuwahara 1971)

References

Insect pheromones
Insecticides
Insect ecology
Biological control agents of pest insects
Insect reproduction